Black Snow is a 2017 Argentine–Spanish thriller film directed by Martín Hodara (in his solo directorial debut) which stars Ricardo Darín, Leonardo Sbaraglia, and Laia Costa alongside Federico Luppi and Dolores Fonzi.

Plot 
The plot concerns about the return of Marcos (together with pregnant wife Laura) to his native Argentina, moving to a remote location in Patagonia to meet with brother Salvador (a presumed fratricide perpetrator) to convince him to sell the lands they both inherited.

Cast

Production 
The film is a Pampa Films, A Contracorriente Films, Gloriamundi Producciones, and Bowfinger International Pictures production. It was shot in between Spain (La Seu d'Urgell), Andorra, and Argentina (Buenos Aires).

Release 
The film was theatrically released in Argentina on 19 January 2017 by Buena Vista International. It was presented at the 20th Málaga Film Festival on 18 March 2017. Distributed by A Contracorriente Films, it was theatrically released in Spain on 12 April 2017.

Reception 
Alejandro Lingenti of La Nación rated Black Snow as "good", describing it as "a sour and pessimistic film" having its greatest strenghts in Darín's and Sbaraglia's performances.

Jonathan Holland of The Hollywood Reporter pointed out that despite the early slow burn, "narrative confusion and implausibility strike over the final run", and it's "that wobbly final stretch that will linger in viewers' minds", underpinning a "less chilling experience than it presumably aims to be".

Raquel Hernández Luján of HobbyConsolas rated the film with 62 points ("acceptable"), citing the "amazing" cinematography and the privilege of having Sbaraglia, Darín, and Luppi together (even if the director does not make the most out of it), but pointing out the film's main flaw to be its writing ("very flat and monotonous in the beginning and rushed in the end").

Javier Ocaña of El País found similarities with Affliction and A Simple Plan, otherwise considering that the film boasts "more visual and acting strength than narrative [strength]", failing to crystallize its ideas into an impactful thriller.

Sergio F. Pinilla of Cinemanía rated Black Snow 3½ out of 5 stars, deeming it to be "an effective, solvent film", once again demonstrating the expertise of Argentine cinema when approaching a certain brand of "intimate, claustrophobic" thriller.

Accolades 

|-
| align = "center" | 2018 || 10th Gaudí Awards || Best Actor || Ricardo Darín ||  || 
|}

See also 
 List of Argentine films of the 2010s
 List of Spanish films of 2017

References 

Films shot in Buenos Aires
Films shot in Andorra
Films shot in the province of Lleida
Argentine thriller films
2010s Argentine films
2010s Spanish films
2010s Spanish-language films
Films set in Argentina
Spanish thriller films
Bowfinger International Pictures films